An EMD MP15T is a 1,500 hp (1,100 kW) 4-axle diesel switcher locomotive built by General Motors Electro-Motive Division between October 1984 and November 1987. Instead of a non-turbocharged 12-cylinder EMD 645 engine it uses a turbocharged 8-cylinder engine. The external appearance of the engine remains similar to other MP15 models.

42 of these locomotives were built for the Seaboard System Railroad, 1200–1241 (later merged into CSX Transportation where they kept their numbers) and one unit for Dow Chemical Company, number 957.

In 2010 Progress Rail, a fully owned subsidiary of Caterpillar, purchased MP15T 1220 from CSX making CSX's total count 40.

See also
 List of GM-EMD locomotives

References

External links
 
 Sarberenyi, Robert. EMD MP15DC, MP15AC, and MP15T Original Owners
 EMD MP15T photos at rrpicturearchives.net

MP15T
Seaboard System Railroad
B-B locomotives
Diesel-electric locomotives of the United States
Railway locomotives introduced in 1984
Standard gauge locomotives of the United States

Shunting locomotives